Isbé is a 1742 opera by Jean-Joseph Cassanéa de Mondonville to a libretto by Henri-Francois de La Rivière (1648–1738) A pastorale héroïque in 5 acts and a prologue, the opera was premiered in Paris on 10 April 1742. The plot concerns Adamas, chief Druid, who conceives a passion for Isbé.

Recordings
 2016: Katherine Watson, Isbé ; Reinoud Van Mechelen, Coridon ; Thomas Dolié, Adamas ; Chantal Santon-Jeffery, Desire / Charite ; Alain Buet, Iphis / Third hamadryad ; Blandine Folio-Peres, Fashion / Céphise ; Rachel Redmond, Ámor / A shepherdess / Clymėne / A nymph ; Artavazd Sargsyan, Tircis / First hamadryad / Forest god ; Komáromi Márton, Second hamadryad, Purcell Choir, Orfeo Orchestra, György Vashegyi. Glossa Records

References

Operas
1742 operas
French-language operas
Operas by Jean-Joseph Cassanéa de Mondonville